Mantech may refer to:

ManTech International, a U.S. Department of Defense contractor specializing in national security and technology issues
 Praying Mantech, an invectid machine from the Spider Riders series of novels
 Mantech, a 1984 Remco toyline
 ManTech Robot Warriors, an Archie Comics publication based on the toyline